Ousseini Nji Mfifen Mounpain (born 20 January 1994) is a Cameroonian professional footballer who plays as a defender or midfielder for Skopje.

Career
As a youth player, Mounpain joined the youth academy of Argentine fifth-tier side Asociación Atlética Jorge Griffa. After that, he joined the youth academy of Racing (Avellaneda) in the Argentine top flight. In 2013, he signed for Argentine fourth tier club . In 2015, Mounpain signed for Muñiz in the Argentine fifth tier. In 2016, he signed for Uruguayan second tier club Atenas. Before the second half of 2017–18, he signed for Skopje in North Macedonia.

In 2018, Mounpain signed for Austrian second tier team Austria Klagenfurt, where he made 18 league appearances. On 17 August 2018, he debuted for [Austria Klagenfurt during a 1–0 loss to Wacker II. In 2020, Mounpain signed for Tarbes in the French sixth tier. After that, he signed for Greek outfit Kozani. Before the second half of 2021–22, he returned to Skopje in North Macedonia.

References

External links
 Ousseini Mounpain at playmakerstats.com

Living people
1994 births
Footballers from Yaoundé
Cameroonian footballers
Association football defenders
Association football midfielders
Cameroon international footballers
2. Liga (Austria) players
Macedonian First Football League players
Uruguayan Segunda División players
AEP Kozani F.C. players
Atenas de San Carlos players
FK Skopje players
Huracán F.C. players
SK Austria Klagenfurt players
Tarbes Pyrénées Football players
Cameroonian expatriate footballers
Cameroonian expatriate sportspeople in Argentina
Expatriate footballers in Argentina
Cameroonian expatriate sportspeople in Austria
Expatriate footballers in Austria
Cameroonian expatriate sportspeople in France
Expatriate footballers in France
Cameroonian expatriate sportspeople in Greece
Expatriate footballers in Greece
Cameroonian expatriate sportspeople in North Macedonia
Expatriate footballers in North Macedonia
Cameroonian expatriate sportspeople in Uruguay
Expatriate footballers in Uruguay